was a Japanese politician who served as Prime Minister of Japan from 1991 to 1993. He was a member of the National Diet of Japan for over 50 years.

Early life and education
Miyazawa was born into a wealthy, politically active family in Fukuyama, Hiroshima, on 8 October 1919, as the eldest son of politician Yutaka Miyazawa and his wife Koto. His father was a member of the Diet, and his mother was the daughter of politician Ogawa Heikichi, who served as Minister of Justice and Minister of Railways. Following the 1923 Great Kantō earthquake, Miyazawa lived at his grandfather Ogawa Heikichi's villa Kasuian in Hiratsuka. At the time, his father Yutaka worked for Yamashita Kisen, whilst planning to move his political career from Hiroshima Prefecture to the National Diet. Miyazawa graduated from Tokyo Imperial University with a degree in law.

Career
In 1942, Miyazawa joined the Ministry of Finance, avoiding military service during World War II. While in the Ministry, he became a protégé of future prime minister Hayato Ikeda.

In 1953, at Ikeda's urging, Miyazawa ran for and won election to the Upper House of the National Diet, where he remained until moving to the Lower House in 1967. As a leading figure in Ikeda's Kōchikai policy group, Miyazawa was considered a member of Ikeda's "brains trust." In 1961, Miyazawa accompanied Ikeda to a summit meeting with U.S. President John F. Kennedy, and due to his excellent English, served as Ikeda's sole translator during the latter's "yacht talks" with Kennedy on Kennedy's presidential yacht, the Honey Fitz.

Beginning with the Ikeda cabinet, Miyazawa held a number of important government posts, including Director of the Economic Planning Agency (1962-1964), Director of the Economic Planning Agency (1966-1968), Minister of International Trade and Industry (1970–1971), Minister of Foreign Affairs (1974–1976), Director of the Economic Planning Agency (1977–1978), and Chief Cabinet Secretary (1984–1986). He became Minister of Finance under the government of Noboru Takeshita in July 1986. However, Miyazawa had to resign from this post amid the Recruit scandal in 1988.

Prime minister

Miyazawa became Prime Minister on 5 November 1991 backed by his faction. Miyazawa gained brief fame in the United States when President George H. W. Bush vomited in his lap and fainted during a state dinner on 8 January 1992.

In 1992, while he was in South Korea, he formally apologized for Japan's use of comfort women, making him the first Japanese leader to acknowledge that Japan's military coerced women into sexual slavery before and during the second world war.

His government passed a law allowing Japan to send its forces overseas for peacekeeping missions as well as negotiating a trade agreement with the United States. It also introduced financial reforms to address the growing economic malaise in Japan in the 1990s. Miyazawa resigned in 1993 after losing a vote of no confidence marking an end to 38 years of Liberal Democratic Party government. The reason for the vote was a scandal involving Fumio Abe, a member of Miyazawa's faction. The Liberal Democratic Party returned to power in June 1994.

Subsequent career

Miyazawa later returned to frontbench politics when he was once again appointed finance minister from 1998 to 2001 in the governments of Keizō Obuchi and Yoshirō Mori. In 1998, Miyazawa replaced Hikaru Matsunaga as finance minister. 
He served a total of 14 terms in both upper and lower houses before retiring from politics in 2003. The reason for his retirement was that then prime minister Junichiro Koizumi set an age limit of 73 for LDP political candidates.

Personal life
Miyazawa married while studying in the United States. He and his wife, Yoko, had two children: Hiro, an architect, and Keiko, who became wife of diplomat Christopher J. Lafleur. He published a book, entitled Secret Talks Between Tokyo and Washington, which was translated into English by Robert D. Eldridge in 2007. The book is about Miyazawa's views concerning the relationships between the US and Japan in terms of the political, economic, and security-related negotiations during the period of 1949 and 1954.

Death
Miyazawa died in Tokyo at the age of 87 on 28 June 2007.

References

External links

|-

|-

|-

|-

|-

|-

|-

|-

|-

|-

|-

|-

|-

1919 births
2007 deaths
20th-century prime ministers of Japan
People from Fukuyama, Hiroshima
University of Tokyo alumni
Prime Ministers of Japan
Deputy Prime Ministers of Japan
Economic planning ministers of Japan
Ministers of Finance of Japan
Ministers of Agriculture, Forestry and Fisheries of Japan
Liberal Democratic Party (Japan) politicians
Members of the House of Councillors (Japan)
Members of the House of Representatives (Japan)
Foreign ministers of Japan
Kiichi
Politicians from Hiroshima Prefecture